Diego Abella Calleja (born 22 October 1998) is a Mexican professional footballer who plays as a forward.

International career
Abella was called up by Jaime Lozano to participate with the under-23 team at the 2019 Pan American Games, with Mexico winning the third-place match.

Honours
Morelia
Liga de Expansión MX: Clausura 2022

Mexico U23
Pan American Bronze Medal: 2019

References

External links
 
 

1998 births
Living people
Liga MX players
Deportivo Toluca F.C. players
Association football forwards
Atlético Morelia players
Mexican footballers
Footballers from Veracruz
Sportspeople from Córdoba, Veracruz